Shahab ol Din (also Romanized as Shahāb ol Dīn and Shahāb od Dīn) is a village in Naqdi Rural District, Meshgin-e Sharqi District, Meshgin Shahr County, Ardabil Province, Iran. At the 2006 census, its population was 36, in 11 families.

References 

Towns and villages in Meshgin Shahr County